

Church history or ecclesiastical history as an academic discipline studies the history of Christianity and the way the Christian Church has developed since its inception. 

Henry Melvill Gwatkin defined church history as "the spiritual side of the history of civilized people ever since our Master's coming". A. M. Renwick, however, defines it as an account of the Church's success and failure in carrying out Christ's Great Commission. Renwick suggests a fourfold division of church history into missionary activity, church organization, doctrine and "the effect on human life".

Church history is often, but not always, studied from a Christian perspective. Writers from different Christian traditions will often highlight people and events particularly relevant to their own denominational history. Catholic and Orthodox writers often highlight the achievements of the ecumenical councils, while evangelical historians may focus on the Protestant Reformation and the Great Awakenings.

Notable church historians 

 Hegesippus
 Eusebius
 Daniela Müller
 Leonard J. Arrington
 Hans Werner Debrunner
 Henry Melvill Gwatkin
 Owen Chadwick
 Henry Chadwick
 Diarmaid MacCulloch
 George Marsden
 Martin E. Marty
 Mark Noll
 Jaroslav Pelikan
 Catherine Pepinster
 Philip Schaff
 Carl Trueman
 Paul Woolley
 David Brading

See also
 Ecclesiastical history of the Catholic Church
 Bede's Ecclesiastical History of the English People
 Historical theology

References

Further reading
 Reinhold Zippelius, Staat und Kirche. Eine Geschichte von der Antike bis zur Gegenwart, 2nd ed. Mohr Siebeck, Tübingen, 2009, 
 Church History and Religious Culture journal. http://www.brill.com/chrch 

History of Christianity
Christian theology
Fields of history